Nebbi is a town in the Nebbi District of the Northern Region of Uganda. It is the site of the district headquarters.

Location
The coordinates of the town are 2°28'45.0"N, 31°05'24.0"E (Latitude:2.479167; Longitude:31.0900).

Population
The 2002 national population census put the population of Nebbi at about 22,740. In 2010, the Uganda Bureau of Statistics (UBOS) estimated the population at 28,000. In 2011, UBOS estimated the mid-year population at 28,800. In 2014, the national population census put the population at 35,029.

In 2020, UBOS estimated the mid-year population of Nebbi Town Council at 41,400 people. The population agency calculated the annual population growth rate of the municipality at 2.9 percent, between 2014 and 2020.

Points of interest
The following additional points of interest lie in the town or near the town limits:

1. The Offices of Nebbi District Local Government Headquarters

2. The Offices of Nebbi Municipal Council

3. Nebbi Central Market

4. Nebbi General Hospital, a 108-bed public hospital owned by the Uganda Ministry of Health and administered by Nebbi District Local Government.

5. Nebbi Airstrip, owned by the Uganda Civil Aviation Authority

6. Nyacara Church, a place of worship affiliated with the Church of Uganda

7. Afere Church, a place of worship affiliated with the Church of Uganda

8. The headquarters of the Roman Catholic Diocese of Nebbi

9. Nebbi Town Public Library

10. Nebbi Roman Catholic Cathedral.

Photos
Aerial Photo of Nebbi Town

References

External links
 Nebbi Town Council Demands Municipality Status

Nebbi District
Populated places in Northern Region, Uganda
West Nile sub-region